The 2019 NASCAR K&N Pro Series West was the sixty-sixth season of the K&N Pro Series West, a regional stock car racing series sanctioned by NASCAR. It began with the Star Nursery 100 at the Las Vegas Motor Speedway dirt track on February 28, 2019, and concluded with the Arizona Lottery 100 at ISM Raceway on November 9, 2019. Derek Kraus was crowned the champion, ahead of Jagger Jones (who also won Rookie of the Year), Hailie Deegan, and Trevor Huddleston. Derek Thorn entered the season as the defending drivers' champion, but did not defend his championship, deciding instead to focus on super late model racing.

General Tire replaced Goodyear as the official tire supplier of the series in 2019. 2019 also marked the last year of sponsorship from K&N Filters, which began sponsoring the series in 2011. Beginning in 2020, the series was known as the ARCA Menards Series West.

Drivers

Notes

Schedule
On January 9, 2019, NASCAR announced the 2019 schedule. Orange Show and the first date at Kern County were dropped from the schedule in favor of Irwindale and Phoenix. All races in the season are televised on NBCSN on a tape delay basis and shown live on FansChoice.tv.

Notes

Results and standings

Races

Drivers' championship

(key) Bold – Pole position awarded by time. Italics – Pole position set by final practice results or Owners' points. * – Most laps led. ** – All laps led.

Notes
1 – John Wood qualified in the No. 38 for Armani Williams.
2 – Billy Kann and John Wood received championship points, despite the fact that they did not start the race.
3 – Scored points towards the K&N Pro Series East.

See also

2019 Monster Energy NASCAR Cup Series
2019 NASCAR Xfinity Series
2019 NASCAR Gander Outdoors Truck Series
2019 ARCA Menards Series
2019 NASCAR K&N Pro Series East
2019 NASCAR Whelen Modified Tour
2019 NASCAR Pinty's Series
2019 NASCAR PEAK Mexico Series
2019 NASCAR Whelen Euro Series

References

External links

2019 NASCAR KandN Pro Series East
ARCA Menards Series West